Maud Mandel (born June 14, 1967) is an American historian and academic administrator. She is the 18th and current President of Williams College, the first woman to hold that role. Mandel was previously a Professor of History and Judaic Studies and Dean of the College at Brown University. She specialises in twentieth-century French history, with a particular focus on the interaction of Muslim, Jewish, and Armenian communities in France. She is the daughter of Ruth Mandel who was the director of the Eagleton Institute of Politics at Rutgers University.

Early life and education
Mandel received her BA in English from Oberlin College in 1989. In 1993, she received an MA from the University of Michigan, followed in 1998 by a PhD in Modern Jewish History from the same institution.

Brown University

Professorship 
In 1997, she joined the Brown faculty as a visiting assistant professor in the History department.

Mandel's scholarship focuses on ethnic and religious minorities in twentieth-century France. She has written about immigration, nationalism, integration, and inter-ethnic relations. Mandel has particularly emphasized the Muslim, Jewish, and Armenian communities in France and has investigated how these groups interact with each other and with broader society.

Mandel became a full member of the faculty in 2001, served as chair of the Judaic studies program from 2012-2014, and was named a full professor in 2014.

Administration Leadership 
In June 2014, Mandel was named Dean of the College. In this role, she prioritized Brown's advising programs and the development of skills through the undergraduate curriculum. Specific projects led by Mandel include establishment of the Brown Learning Collaborative that stresses liberal arts competencies teaching "through a peer-to-peer approach," 1stY@Brown online coursework that prepares incoming students for undergraduate curriculum rigors, and overseeing the opening of the First-Generation College and Low-Income Student Center.

Williams College 
On March 11, 2018, Mandel was selected to be the 18th president of Williams College. Mandel assumed the position on July 1, 2018.

Selected publications
 In the Aftermath of Genocide: Armenians and Jews in Twentieth Century France. Durham, NC: Duke University Press, 2003. .
 Muslims and Jews in France: History of a Conflict. Princeton, NJ: Princeton University Press, 2014. . 
 Colonialism and the Jews. Edited by Ethan Katz, Lisa Moses Leff, and Maud Mandel. Bloomington, IN: Indiana University Press, 2017. .

See also
Williams College
List of Williams College presidents
Adam Falk

References

Williams College faculty
Presidents of Williams College
American women historians
Historians of Jews and Judaism
Historians of the Armenian genocide
Historians of France
University of Michigan alumni
Oberlin College alumni
1967 births
Living people
Women heads of universities and colleges
Brown University faculty
20th-century American historians
21st-century American historians
20th-century American women
21st-century American women